WaterRace is a Macintosh computer game developed and released by French Touch in December 2000. It is a boat racing game with 9 levels (or locations) and 9 corresponding boats and characters.

External links
WaterRace homepage (archive)
WaterRace review by Inside Mac Games
WaterRace review by Mac OS Journal

2000 video games
Classic Mac OS games
Classic Mac OS-only games
Video games developed in France
Personal watercraft racing video games